The United States Senate election of 1978 in Massachusetts was held on November 7, 1978, with the incumbent Republican Senator Edward Brooke being defeated by Democratic Congressman Paul Tsongas.

Primary elections nominating Tsongas and Brooke were held on September 19.

Brooke was dogged throughout the campaign by questions surrounding his 1975 divorce and an ongoing Senate Ethics investigation. Additionally, he faced a competitive primary challenge that may have weakened his standing ahead of the general election.

Republican primary

Candidates
 Edward Brooke, incumbent Senator
 Avi Nelson, radio and television host and candidate for U.S. House in 1972

Campaign
Senator Brooke, who had been unopposed in his 1972 bid for re-nomination, was challenged by radio host Avi Nelson.

Brooke was considered a liberal, and Nelson attacked him for being out of step with the increasingly conservative Republican Party base. The race drew comparison to the New Jersey Senate Republican primary held in June that year, where young conservative activist Jeff Bell defeated long-serving incumbent liberal Clifford Case. Both elections were considered signs that the Republican Party had moved in a more conservative direction.

During the campaign, Brooke faced questions about his ongoing divorce, but Nelson declined to comment on the issue directly.

Nelson instead focused his attacks on Brooke's support of the Panama Canal Treaty, federally financed abortions, and his decision to decline to sponsor the Roth–Kemp tax cut. In response, Brooke emphasized his support for cuts to the capital gains tax and his opposition to defense spending cuts.

Observers expected that if Nelson won, he would be unlikely to win the general election. In an effort to stave off an upset victory, Republican National Committee Chairman Bill Brock recorded radio advertisements supporting Brooke. Some of Brooke's conservative Senate colleagues also issued a letter of support.

Results
On Election Day, Brooke defeated Nelson by a margin of 17,963 votes.

Brooke performed strongest in Boston and the North Shore, while Nelson received strong support in Plymouth and Bristol counties.

Democratic primary

Candidates
 Kathleen Sullivan Alioto, member of the Boston School Committee
 Paul Guzzi, Secretary of the Commonwealth
 Elaine Noble, State Representative from the Back Bay
 Howard Phillips, former Nixon administration official
 Paul Tsongas, U.S. Representative from Lowell

Campaign
In the early stages of the campaign season, Republican incumbent Ed Brooke seemed like a strong candidate for re-election. In 1972, he defeated his Democratic challenger by nearly 700,000 votes while President Nixon failed to carry the state. Because of Brooke's apparent strength, most Democrats avoided the race in its early stages.

The first to declare her candidacy was Elaine Noble, a two-term State Representative serving the Back Bay and Fenway-Kenmore neighborhoods of Boston. Noble was primarily known for her status as the highest-ranking openly gay elected official in United States history to this point and was described in the Washington Post as "an avowed lesbian."

As Senator Brooke began to appear more vulnerable, more experienced Democrats declared their campaigns. By the time Brooke's divorce proceedings concluded, Noble was joined by Secretary of the Commonwealth Paul Guzzi, Lowell congressman Paul Tsongas, and pro-busing Boston School Committee member Kathleen Alioto, the daughter of New England Patriots founder Billy Sullivan and wife of former San Francisco Mayor Joseph Alioto. Soon, conservative Howard Phillips entered the race, hoping to exploit a four-way split in the liberal vote.

The race was considered a three-way contest between Alioto, Guzzi, and Tsongas. Guzzi was considered the early favorite, due to his statewide office and name recognition. However, Tsongas demonstrated a familiarity with national issues and aired clever ads that played off his hard-to-pronounce name. By the closing days of the campaign, some considered Tsongas the slight favorite.

Results
On Election Day, Tsongas won by a margin of 37,955 votes out of over 835,000 cast. Unlike most Democratic primaries in the state, Tsongas was able to win without a strong showing in Boston and its surrounding suburbs, where most Democrats lived. Instead, he relied on strong support from his base of constituents around Lowell. While Guzzi was strong throughout the state, he was overwhelmed by Tsongas's support in Lowell and the Merrimack Valley. Alioto performed strongest on the South Coast.

General election

Campaign 
Early in the campaign season, Brooke was considered a favorite for re-election. Tsongas was a relatively unknown Representative statewide and nationally, whereas Brooke remained something of an icon as the first popularly-elected black Senator and a member of Republican leadership.

However, Brooke faced mounting scrutiny from the news media after his decision to divorce from his wife of 29 years, Remigia, in 1975. The couple had been separated for many years and Brooke was frequently seen in the company of other women in Washington, including Barbara Walters. After Senator Brooke filed for divorce, Remigia responded with a suit of her own, alleging "cruel and abusive treatment." While not directly addressing Brooke's divorce, Tsongas attacked Brooke as out of touch with Massachusetts voters and too "Washington-oriented."

Both candidates were considered liberals by contemporary definition, with Brooke known as a public supporter of the women's rights movement of the time and Tsongas receiving a perfect rating from the group Americans for Democratic Action. Tsongas was seen as the more liberal of the two, but Brooke ultimately received the support of many liberal Democrats and civil rights leaders, including Rev. Jesse Jackson, Coretta Scott King, and Barney Frank.

The issue of Brooke's divorce became more politically serious in May 1978, when The Boston Globe reported that as part of the divorce proceedings, Brooke had lied about the source of a personal loan. While Brooke argued that the loan had no material impact on his divorce and that he had broken no law, the Senate Ethics Committee conducted a lengthy investigation into the matter that is believed to have hurt Brooke's credibility and standing in the race.

Race was another major issue, demonstrated by the reaction to anti-segregation busing policies in the commonwealth. Brooke was a major opponent of anti-busing legislation and had successfully campaigned against the Biden Amendment to end federal funding of busing programs. Brooke's support of busing policies likely cost him votes in Boston and other working-class white communities, which had rioted in preceding years over the issue. Prominent South Boston politician Louise Day Hicks decried Brooke as an "apostle of urban neglect." For his part, Tsongas largely avoided the busing issue, but did make the claim that voting for Brooke on the basis of his race was "the other side of racism."

Endorsements

Results

See also 
 1978 United States Senate elections

External links and references 
 1978 Congressional Election results

References 

Massachusetts
1978
1978 Massachusetts elections